Leslie Park Hope (25 October 1884 – 12 October 1943) was an Australian rules footballer who played with South Melbourne in the Victorian Football League (VFL).

Notes

External links 

Australian rules footballers from Melbourne
Sydney Swans players
1884 births
1943 deaths
People from North Melbourne